Diogo Dória (born 16 April 1953) is a Portuguese film actor who has worked in France and Portugal and is most associated with his films for director Manoel de Oliveira.

Selected filmography
 1981 Francisca
 1985 The Satin Slipper
 1988 The Cannibals
 1990 No, or the Vain Glory of Command
 1991 The Divine Comedy
 1992 Day of Despair
 1993 Abraham's Valley
 1994 The Box
 1997 Voyage to the Beginning of the World
 1998 Anxiety
 2000 Word and Utopia
 2002 The Uncertainty Principle
 2005 Magic Mirror
 2009 Eccentricities of a Blonde-haired Girl

References

External links

1953 births
Living people
Portuguese male film actors
Male actors from Lisbon